This is a list of the England national football team results from 1900 to 1929.

1900s

1900

1901

1902

1903

1904

1905

1906

1907

1908

1909

1910s

1910

1911

1912

1913

1914

1919

1920s

1920

1921

1922

1923

1924

1925

1926

1927

1928

1929

1900s in England
1910s in England
1920s in England
1900-29